The following is a List of bicycle routes in North Carolina. These routes are designated by the North Carolina Department of Transportation (NCDOT) Bicycle and Pedestrian Transportation Division.

State

U.S. Bicycle Route 1

The North Carolina portion of U.S. Bicycle Route 1 is known as the Carolina Connection and runs north-south through the central portion of the state, passing through Raleigh.

North Carolina Bicycle Route 2

North Carolina Bicycle Route 2 is known as The Mountains to the Sea. Running 700 miles from Murphy in the western mountains to Manteo on the Atlantic coast, this route crosses most of the nine statewide signed and mapped bicycle routes that the North Carolina Department of Transportation has designated.

North Carolina Bicycle Route 3

North Carolina Bicycle Route 3, the Ports of Call Route, is one of nine bicycle routes designated by the North Carolina Department of Transportation. Near Wilmington it connects with North Carolina Bicycle Route 5. It crosses North Carolina Bicycle Route 2 near Washington and North Carolina Bike Route 4 near the Virginia border. Other points of interest along this route include Fort Fisher State Historic Site, Carolina Beach State Park, the Croatan National Forest Recreation Areas, Tryon Palace, Goose Creek State Park and Merchants Millpond State Park.

North Carolina Bicycle Route 4

North Carolina Bicycle Route 4, known as the North Line Trace, is a bicycle path that runs from east to west across North Carolina just south of the state's border with Virginia.

Campgrounds are located roughly every  along the route.

North Carolina Bicycle Route 5

North Carolina Bicycle Route 5, the Cape Fear Run, travels  along the Cape Fear River from Apex through the southeast coastal plain to Wilmington at the sea.  In Wilmington, it connects with North Carolina Bicycle Route 3, the Ports of Call Route.  Rolling hills soon give way to flat land in the swamps and Carolina bays typical of this region of the state.  Notable points of interest include Jones Lake State Park, Moore's Creek National Military Park, the USS North Carolina Battleship Memorial, Brunswick Town State Historic Site, Carolina Beach State Park, and Fort Fisher State Historic Site.

North Carolina Bicycle Route 6

North Carolina Bicycle Route 6, the Piedmont Spur, is a  southern alternate route of the Mountain to the Sea through the North Carolina Piedmont.

The route begins at the intersection of NC 181 (Beatrice Cobb Highway) and Brown Mountain Beach Road.  The route goes south to Morganton and Lincolnton; then east to Boger City, Huntersville, Concord, and Albemarle.  After entering Montgomery County, it goes northeast through the communities of Ophir, Seagrove, and Staley, before ending in Snow Camp at the intersection of Pleasant Hill Church Road and Greensboro-Chapel Hill Road.

The route is well marked with directions, also "Share the Road" signs are typical along portions of the North Carolina Highways that overlap with the bicycle route.  A few locations along the route, specifically in Mecklenburg, Cabarrus, and Stanly counties, can be considered dangerous because of either construction or high traffic volumes along route.

North Carolina Bicycle Route 7

The route passes through New Bern and Beaufort and utilizes the Cedar Island Ferry to Ocracoke.

North Carolina Bicycle Route 8

North Carolina Bicycle Route 8, the Southern Highlands, runs  through the Blue Ridge Mountains in southwestern North Carolina. The east end of the route is Bike Route 6 near Lincolnton.

North Carolina Bicycle Route 9

North Carolina Bicycle Route 9, the Sandhills Sector, is a  moderate difficulty route from NC Bicycle Route 6, east of Lake Tillery/Pee Dee River, to NC Bicycle Route 5, in Gum Springs.  The route travels through the Uwharrie National Forest, Mount Gilead, Aberdeen, Raeford and Hope Mills.

Regional

Lake Norman Bicycle Route

The Lake Norman Bicycle Route connects five towns and cities in three counties that surround Lake Norman, the largest inland body of water in the state. The overall route, using the "LN" signage, traverses between Huntersville and Sherrills Ford, with loops and spurs that also connect Cornelius, Davidson, Mooresville, Troutman, and Lake Norman State Park. The route was established jointly between the Centralina Council of Governments and NCDOT Bicycle and Pedestrian Division.

Pottery Loop

The Pottery Loop connects 13 small towns in four counties in central North Carolina. The route highlights potters, equestrian ranches, peach growing farms as well as several game lands and wildlife reserves. Signage along the route use the letters "PL," and overlaps in some sections with USBR 1, NCBR 6, and NCBR 9. The route was established as part of the Central Park Bicycle Plan, jointly between the Piedmont Triad Regional Council and NCDOT Bicycle and Pedestrian Division.

External links
 North Carolina Bike Routes (NCDOT)

References

Bike paths in North Carolina
North Carolina